Lewis Morgan (30 April 1911 – 22 September 1988) was a Scottish professional footballer player who played as a right back.

Born in Cowdenbeath, Morgan represented Scotland at schoolboy level and played for various Scottish junior clubs before joining Dundee in 1931. He represented the Scottish League in 1933. Morgan transferred to English side Portsmouth two years later, playing mostly at left back, and he was part of the Portsmouth team that beat Wolves 4–1 in the 1939 FA Cup Final. After the Second World War he joined Watford, playing 50 Football League games for them before being released on a free transfer. Morgan then played for Chelmsford City, signing for the club in May 1948.

Honours
Portsmouth
FA Cup: 1939

References

Scottish footballers
English Football League players
Portsmouth F.C. players
Dundee F.C. players
Watford F.C. players
People from Cowdenbeath
1911 births
1988 deaths
Scotland youth international footballers
Scottish Football League players
Scottish Football League representative players
Association football fullbacks
Chelmsford City F.C. players
Crossgates Primrose F.C. players
Footballers from Fife
Scottish Junior Football Association players
FA Cup Final players
Bowhill Rovers F.C. players